Statistics of League of Ireland in the 1972/1973 season.

Overview
It was contested by 14 teams, and Waterford won the championship.

Final classification

Results

Top scorers

Ireland, 1972-73
1972–73 in Republic of Ireland association football
League of Ireland seasons